Antonio Roldán Betancur Airport  is an airport serving Apartadó, a town in the Antioquia Department of Colombia. The airport is named after Antonio Roldán Betancur, who was governor of Antioquia from 1988 until his assassination in 1989.

The Los Cedros VOR-DME (Ident: LCE) is located on the field.

In 2016, the airport handled 210,550 passengers, and 201,330 in 2017.

Airlines and destinations

See also
 Transport in Colombia
 List of airports in Colombia

References

External links
 OurAirports - Antonio Roldán Betancourt
 SkyVector - Antonio Roldán Betancourt
 FallingRain - Antonio Roldán Betancourt Airport
 
 

Airports in Colombia
Buildings and structures in Antioquia Department